The Black Umfolozi River is one of the two main tributaries to the Umfolozi River in KwaZulu Natal, South Africa. It forms part of the Upper Umfolozi (Zulu: Enhla neMfolozi) – the Lower Umfolozi being the area downstream of its confluence with the White Umfolozi.

Etymology
The river is called "black" because of the dark (black) stones which are found along its course. Imfolozi means "zig-zag", which reflects the pattern the river follows along its course.

Course
It flows through Swart-Mfolozi, Ceza, Nongoma and eventually has a confluence with the White Umfolozi near the southeastern boundary of Hluhluwe-Umfolozi Game Reserve to form the Umfolozi River. The Thangami Safari Spa is also situated on its banks. Empangeni and Mtubatuba are two major areas related to the Lower Umfolozi region.

History
Zwide, chief of king of the very powerful Ndwandwe tribe had his own domain north and east of the Black Umfolozi River.

Gallery

References 

Rivers of KwaZulu-Natal